The Kiss 40th Anniversary World Tour was a concert tour by American rock band Kiss. Def Leppard joined Kiss for the first 42 shows of the tour. Kobra and the Lotus and The Dead Daisies were the opening acts.

In the tour program for Kiss' final tour, Simmons reflected on the tour:

Kiss setlists

North American setlist
Main Setlist
 "Psycho Circus"
 "Deuce"
 "Shout It Out Loud"
 "War Machine"
 "Hotter Than Hell" (with fire breathing)
 "I Love It Loud"
 "Lick It Up"
 "God of Thunder" (with bass solo, blood spitting and flying)
 "Hide Your Heart"
 "Calling Dr. Love"
 "Love Gun" (Paul Stanley flies out to the B-Stage)
 "Black Diamond"
 "Detroit Rock City"
 "Rock and Roll All Nite"

The setlist throughout the North American leg varied from show to show. Other songs played include: "King of the Night Time World", "Makin' Love", "Christine Sixteen", "Creatures of the Night", "Cold Gin", "Let Me Go, Rock 'n' Roll", "Plaster Caster", "Tears Are Falling", "Hell or Hallelujah", "I Was Made for Lovin' You", "Parasite", and "Do You Love Me?"

Japanese setlist
 "Detroit Rock City"
 "Creatures of the Night"
 "Psycho Circus"
 "Parasite"
 "Shout It Out Loud"
 "War Machine" (with fire breathing)
 "Do You Love Me?"
 "Deuce"
 "Hell or Hallelujah" (with guitar solo)
 "I Love It Loud"
 "Sukiyaki" (Kyu Sakamoto cover, a cappella)
 "Lick It Up"
 "God of Thunder" (with bass solo, blood spitting and flying)
 "Love Gun" (Stanley flies out to the B-Stage)
 "Black Diamond"

Encore
 "I Was Made for Lovin' You"
 "Samurai Son"
 "Rock and Roll All Nite"

 "Hide Your Heart" only played in Nagoya
 "Yume no Ukiyo ni Saitemina" only played in Tokyo

South American setlist
 "Detroit Rock City"
 "Creatures of the Night"
 "Psycho Circus"
 "I Love It Loud"
 "War Machine" (with fire breathing)
 "Do You Love Me?"
 "Deuce"
 "Hell or Hallelujah" (with guitar solo)
 "Calling Dr. Love"
 "Lick It Up"
 "God of Thunder" (with bass solo, blood spitting and flying)
 "Hide Your Heart"
 "Love Gun" (Stanley flies out to the B-Stage)
 "Black Diamond"

Encore
 "Shout It Out Loud"
 "I Was Made for Lovin' You"
 "Rock and Roll All Nite"

European setlist
 "Detroit Rock City"
 "Deuce"
 "Psycho Circus"
 "Creatures of the Night"
 "I Love It Loud"
 "War Machine" (with fire breathing)
 "Do You Love Me?"
 "Hell or Hallelujah" (with guitar solo)
 "Calling Dr. Love"
 "Lick It Up"
 "God of Thunder" (with bass solo, blood spitting and flying)
 "Parasite"
 "Love Gun" (Stanley flies out to the B-Stage)
 "Black Diamond"

Encore
 "Shout It Out Loud"
 "I Was Made for Lovin' You"
 "Rock and Roll All Nite"

 "Cold Gin" replaced "Parasite" after the Rock in Vienna show.

Oceanian setlist
 "Detroit Rock City"
 "Deuce"
 "Psycho Circus"
 "Creatures of the Night"
 "I Love It Loud"
 "War Machine" (with fire breathing)
 "Do You Love Me?"
 "Hell or Hallelujah" (with guitar solo)
 "Calling Dr. Love"
 "Lick It Up"
 "God of Thunder" (with bass solo, blood spitting and flying)
 "Cold Gin"
 "Love Gun" (Stanley flies out to the B-Stage)
 "Black Diamond"

Encore
 "Shandi" (performed by Stanley)
"Shout It Out Loud"
 "I Was Made for Lovin' You"
 "Rock and Roll All Nite"

Def Leppard setlist
 "Let It Go" 
 "Rocket" 
 "Animal" 
 "Foolin'" 
 "Love Bites" 
 "Let's Get Rocked" 
 "Two Steps Behind" (Acoustic)
 "Bringin' On the Heartbreak" (Acoustic/Electric)
 "Switch 625" 
 "Hysteria" 
 "Armageddon It" 
 "Pour Some Sugar on Me" 
Encore
 "Rock of Ages" 
 "Photograph"

 "Rocket" was played after Hysteria starting with the 11th show which was held in Austin TX
 "Rocket" not played in Los Angeles and Phoenix

Tour dates

Boxscore

Personnel

Kiss
Paul Stanley – vocals, rhythm guitar
Gene Simmons – vocals, bass
Eric Singer – drums, vocals
Tommy Thayer – lead guitar, backing vocals

Def Leppard
Joe Elliott – lead vocals, acoustic guitar
Phil Collen – lead & rhythm guitars, backing vocals
Vivian Campbell – lead & rhythm guitars, backing vocals
Rick Savage – bass, keyboards, backing vocals
Rick Allen – drums, percussion

References

Notes

Citations

2014 concert tours
2015 concert tours
Kiss (band) concert tours
Def Leppard concert tours